The anthem of the Amazonas State, Venezuela, was written by Hernán Gruber Odremán, who also composed the music for it.

Lyrics in Spanish language

Chorus

Amazonas tu tierra engalana las
espumas del bravo raudal en tu
selva se yergue el autana
atalaya de todo tu lar.

I 
Para honrar la memoria sagrada
del glorioso mariscal de
Ayacucho su gesta preciada tomó
el nombre de tu gran capital.

II 
En tu sierra Parima, imponente
nace el Río Orinoco, que Díos en
sus aguas sonoras, corrientes a
tu pueblo alimento ofrendo.

III 
Un emporio bendito es tu suelo,
del aborigen refugio y hogar,
de la patria ellos son los primeros
y su origen honra nacional.

IV 
Tu gran pueblo marcha al porvenir
con coraje y nobleza de
ideal y en tu cielo veremos lucir
Amazonas tu prez sin igual.

See also
 List of anthems of Venezuela

Anthems of Venezuela
Spanish-language songs
Year of song unknown